Arlington Town Square is a retail and apartment development located in Arlington Heights.  After a huge revamp and building boom, numerous new condominium, retail, office, and park spaces were built so improving the area.  It is home to national retail and restaurant chains, along with local, independent business. The center is also home to the Arlington Theaters.

Major stores and restaurants include Passero, Ann Taylor LOFT, Yankee Candle, Bath and Body Works, @properties, Sportsclips, 
Noodles & Company, and Starbucks Coffee.

References

External links

2000 establishments in Illinois
Arlington Heights, Illinois
Shopping malls in Cook County, Illinois
Shopping malls established in 2000